Cita is a ghost town in Randall County, located in the U.S. state of Texas.

References

Ghost towns in West Texas
Ghost towns in Texas